Porcelli v Strathclyde Regional Council [1986] ICR 564 is a UK labour law case concerning sex discrimination.

Facts
Some male co-workers at Strathclyde Regional Council made sexually abusive comments to a Ms Porcelli. Employers are under a duty of care for their employees, so the law deems them to be vicariously liable for the other employees. Ms Porcelli sued the council for sexual discrimination. The council argued that really, the comments were not about sex discrimination, and although they used certain sexually charged terms, really it was just general abuse because they did not like her.

Judgment
Lord Emmerslie held that even though the abuse was motivated by not liking her rather than being sexist, it was still different treatment on grounds of sex (this was before a self-standing harassment provision). The sexual language was a "sexual sword", and therefore had to be included in the scope of the provisions combatting sex discrimination.

See also
Robichaud v. Canada (Treasury Board)
UK employment discrimination law
UK labour law

Notes

Anti-discrimination law in the United Kingdom
Discrimination in Scotland
Employment Appeal Tribunal cases
1985 in case law
1985 in Scotland
1985 in British law
Harassment case law